"I Kill Giants" is a promotional single from In Rolling Waves, the second studio album from The Naked and Famous.

Premise 
According to vocalist Alisa Xayalith, the song is about her losing her mother to breast cancer at a very young age, admitting that "[She] felt insecure singing about something so infinitely painful and blatantly autobiographical." The title comes from a comic book of the same name by Joe Kelly.

Though intended for inclusion on debut album Passive Me, Aggressive You, the tune was not finished in time for that album.

Video 
The music video, which debuted on the same day, features two women performing theatrical dance in front of a church congregation, and was directed by Joel Kefali.

Critical reception 
The song is described by Kyle Ryan of The A.V. Club as being the song that has a large 3 note chorus with staccato synthesizer that lifts the tempo of the album following the tranquil song "Golden Girl".  Matt Collar of AllMusic describes the composition as "particularly epic in proportion and cinematic in its emotional momentum".

Track listing 
UK promo single
 "I Kill Giants" (Radio Edit) – 3:39
 "I Kill Giants" (Instrumental) – 4:12

Personnel 
Credits adapted from the liner notes of In Rolling Waves.
 Billy Bush – engineer
 John Catlin – engineer (mix)
 Joe LaPorta – mastered
 Justin Meldal-Johnsen – producer
 Alan Moulder – mixing
 Thom Powers – producer
 David Schwerkolt – engineer (assistant)

References

External links 
 

The Naked and Famous songs
2013 singles
2013 songs